Paths of Hate is a short animated film from Poland, released in 2011. A Platige Image production, its writer and director is Damian Nenow.

Story 
The film tells about the anger and hatred that lies deep in the human soul through two fighter pilots fighting each other.

Awards and achievements 

 Special Distinction at Annecy International Animation Film Festival in 2011.
 Best International Animated Film and Special Jury Prize at Mundos Digitales, La Coruna, Spain (2011).
 The film competed in the Best Animated Short Subject category at the 39th Annie Awards.
 Grand Jury Prize at VI Córdoba International Animation Festival - ANIMA

References

External links 

 

Polish animated short films